Kalan(also Romanized as Kalān, Kūlān, and Kullān) is a village in Darreh Seydi Rural District, in the Central District of Borujerd County, Lorestan Province, Iran. According to the 2006 census, its population was 63, in 13 families.

References 

Towns and villages in Borujerd County